Uí Fiachrach Finn was a territory located in Máenmaige in what is now central County Galway.

It was home to the families of Ó Maolalaidh and Ó Neachtain. By the 15th century the Ó Maolalaidh's had been expelled and settled north of Tuam, while the Ó Neachtain's had been forced to relocate in the Fews of Athlone.

Annalistic references

 1190. Mail-Seachlainn Ua Neachtain and Gilla-Beraigh Ua Sluaigheadhaigh were killed by Toirrdhealbach, son of Ruaidhri Ua Conchubair.
 1273. Gilla-Crisd Ua Neachtain and William Ua Neachtain were killed by Ruaighri, son of Toirrdhelbach Ua Conchubhair.
 1279, Domhnall mac Giollu Criost Uí Neachtain was slain by Aodh Ó Con Cenainn.
 1392. A raid by Cathal son of Ruaidhrí son of Toirdhealbhach Ó Conchobhair on the son of Eochaidh Ó Ceallaigh, and he took cattle and horses into the Feadha with him. Peace was made between the same kings, i.e. a division of territory, namely of the Feadha, was also made between the two Muinntear Neachtain.

See also
 Uí Fiachrach

References
 Medieval Ireland: Territorial, Political and Economic Divisions, Paul MacCotter, Four Courts Press, 2008. 
 http://www.rootsweb.ancestry.com/~irlkik/ihm/connacht.htm#aid

History of County Galway
Medieval Ireland